Tumba-Lediima Nature Reserve is a protected area in the Democratic Republic of the Congo. It lies immediately east of the Congo River, in Mai-Ndombe and Équateur provinces, and extends from east of the town of Yumbi to just south of the town of Liranga.

It protects a portion of the eastern Congolian swamp forests.

The reserve was designated in 2006, and covers an area of 7411.77 km2.

The reserve, along with Ngiri Triangle Nature Reserve to the northeast, is part of the Triangle de la Ngiri Ramsar Site, a designated wetland of international importance covering 65,696.24 km2.

References

Protected areas of the Democratic Republic of the Congo
Mai-Ndombe Province
Province of Équateur